The United States Olympic & Paralympic Museum (USOPM) is a historical and cultural sports museum located in Colorado Springs, Colorado, United States, first opened on July 30, 2020. The museum is part of the City for Champions development project in Colorado Springs, though it licenses the Olympic name and operates separately from the United States Olympic & Paralympic Committee (USOPC). The museum recognizes Olympic and Paralympic athletes who have represented Team USA.

History
Groundbreaking for the museum was held on June 9, 2017. As the home of the United States Olympic & Paralympic Committee (USOPC), the first and main United States Olympic Training Center, and two dozen National Governing Bodies, Colorado Springs is an ideal home for the museum. The museum has a licensing agreement with the USOPC.

Description
The $91million, 60,000-square foot museum is dedicated to American Olympic and Paralympic athletes and their stories. Museum guests purchase entry passes then proceed to an elevator that goes to the third floor. From there, inspired by the Guggenheim Museum, a ramped path winds downwards through several museum galleries, the theater, and gift shop on the main floor. There are no steps.

The museum is notably accessible (it is fully ADA compliant) and interactive, designed so guests of all abilities can see all the exhibitions and participate equally. Some of the technologies implemented include captions, descriptive audio tracks, ASL translations, assisted listening, RFID-enabled guest lanyards (e.g. text is automatically enlarged for visually-disabled visitors), and accessible exhibition spaces and paths. Team USA athletes were involved and consulted throughout the project. Gallagher & Associates designed the museum's exhibitions.

The USOPM was designed by Diller Scofidio + Renfro with an eye toward creating a building in motion; an overhead view of the building resembles a discus thrower in mid-throw. The exterior of the museum is composed of 9,000 unique diamond-shaped reflective aluminum panels, with no two panels exactly alike.

It is located in the southwest part of downtown Colorado Springs, at the intersection of S.Sierra Madre Street and W.Vermijo Avenue.

Notable holdings and exhibitions
 Complete set of Olympic Torches (1936–present)
 A complete set of Olympic medals
 Artworks by LeRoy Neiman
 Interactive sports demonstrations (30-meter dash, alpine skiing, archery, goalball, skeleton, and sled hockey)
 Simulated Parade of Nations

References

External links 
 

United States Olympic Committee
Museums in Colorado Springs, Colorado
Museums established in 2020
2020 establishments in Colorado
Sports museums in Colorado